The Bird that Spoke the Truth (Spanish: El pájaro que contaba verdades) is a New Mexican folktale. It is related to the motif of the calumniated wife and classified in the international Aarne-Thompson-Uther Index as type ATU 707, "The Three Golden Children".

Sources
The tale was collected in Northern New Mexico by José Manuel Espinosa in the 1930s from a twelve-year-old informant named María del Carmen González, who lived in San Ildefonso. The tale was originally titled Los niños perseguidos. It was later republished by Joe Hayes in 1998 with the title El pájaro que contaba verdades ("The Bird that spoke the Truth").

Summary
A man and his wife have three children: two boys with golden hair and a girl with a star on the forehead. One day, a jealous old witch breaks into their house, takes the children and abandons them in a canyon to die. Their parents return home. Their father, noticing the children's absence, blames his wife and locks her up behind a wall.

Meanwhile, the three children are saved by an old lady, who gives them shelter. On her deathbed, the old lady gives a magic bead to each of them that will serve as token of life.

Some time later, the jealous witch finds the children and visits them. She tells them about a bird of green feathers, a bottle of holy water and a whistle. The elder brother decides to quest for these items and goes to the mountains, where he meets an old man and his wife. The old man advises him to roll a ball and put cotton in his ears. The boy kicks the ball and follows it, but he hears the voices in the mountains and turns to stone.

The girl notices that a bead has blackened, and sends her other brother to find out what has happened. The second brother follows the same trail and reaches the house of the old couple. He receives the same advice, but forgets to cover his ears with cotton and is also turned to stone.

Finally, the girl notices that the second bead has blackened, and goes to the mountains with trimming accessories. She meets the old couple and offers to trim the old man's beard. In return for the girl's kind deed, he tells her how to get the bird with green feathers. He also tells her that she can find the holy water on the mountain, which will restore her brothers to normal. She follows the old man's instructions, gets the bird and the whistle, and restores her brothers to life.

Some time later, their father stops by the siblings' house, but he does not recognize them, because they are wearing caps to hide their hair. The green-feathered bird tells the whole story to the man and the siblings, then jumps on the table and takes off the caps. The father recognizes his children and they return to release their mother.

Analysis

Tale type
The tale is classified in the international Aarne-Thompson-Uther Index as type ATU 707, "The Three Golden Children", a tale type that, according to William Bernard McCarthy, is "widely collected" in Ibero-American tradition. In the same vein, Stith Thompson noted that the Latin American variants represent one of three traditions of tale type 707 that occur in America, the others being the Portuguese and Franco-Canadian, and German ethnologue  located variants in California and New Mexico.

Variants

North America

United States
A variant was collected from a Spanish-descent fifteen-year-old named Philomene Gonzalez, from Delacroix Island, Louisiana, in 1941. In this variant, titled Golden Star, a maiden wishes to marry the prince and to have a boy with white and golden hair and with a star on the forehead. She gives birth to this boy and a girl with the same traits the following year. An old woman replaces the children for puppies and throws them in the river, but God rescues them. This version lacks the quest for the items, and concludes when God sends them to a feast with the king.

In a tale collected in 1966, in Los Angeles, with the title El pájaro que habla, three kings take shelter during a storm in the house where three princesses live. The princesses see the kings and profess their wishes: the first will sew clothes for the king that can fit in a nutshell; the second a cape that can fit in a pine nut; and the third that she will bear three children, a boy with golden hair, a boy with silver hair and a girl with the star on the front. Years later, the three children seek the bird that talks, a tree that yields fruit, and the water of a thousand colours.

New Mexico
In New Mexican variant collected from informant Guadalupe Gallegos, from West Las Vegas, New Mexico, titled The Bird of Truth, or The Three Treasures, a father warns his three daughters to avoid gossiping, because the king might hear them. And so it happens: the king wears a commoner disguise and spies on the three sisters. The elder sister wants to marry the king's cook to eat wonderful dishes, the middle one the king's baker to eat the best pastries, and the youngest the king himself, for she promises to bear him three children with hair of gold, "like their father". The king chooses the youngest sister as his queen, to the jealousy of the other two. The queen gives birth first to a girl, then to two boys in the following years. Her sisters cast their nephews and niece in the garden and replace them by puppies, but the children are saved by the gardener. The siblings are raised by the gardener and his wife, who makes the children wear wigs to hide their hair. The children grow up and build a palace for themselves. One day, a nun visits their palace and tells them about three missing treasures: the golden water, the talking bird, and the singing tree.

In a variant titled El Pájaro Verde, collected by Arthur L. Campa for his 1930 thesis, a queen has two sons and a daughter, but each time a child is born, the queen's jealous servants take the child and lie to the king that the child was stillborn. The children are cast in the water, but they are rescued by an old woman who raises them. On her deathbed, the old woman tells the children, named José, María and Jesús, about a mountain located in the city of Trina, where three treasures are found: the bird that talks, the tree that sings and the water of life. She exhorts them to quest for the items in order to ensure a life-long happiness for them.

Puerto Rico
Author Rafael Ramírez de Arellano published three variants from Puerto Rico. In the first, titled Las Tres Hermanas, three sisters live in a house on the outskirts of town, on the way to the palace. One day, the king overhears their conversation: the elder sister wants to marry the king's cook to eat better dishes; the middle one the king's baker to eat the best bread; and the youngest the king himself, for she will bear him two boys with the sun on the front and a girl with the moon on the forehead. The elder sisters, jealous of the youngest's luck, take the children and cast them in the sea, and replace them for puppies. After their birth, the king imprisons the queen in the dungeons, without food and water, but a servant secretly stashes her some bread and water. As for the children, they are saved by a fisherman, who hides the children's astral birthmarks with a kerchief. They are insulted by the fisherman's biological children and leave home. They meet a kind old woman, who gives them an orange that creates a palace for them. An evil witch visits their new palace and convinces them to seek the parrot that speaks and the fountain of the water of life.

In the second variant, titled El Pájaro que Habla, the king marries a beautiful, but poor woman, to the court's disgust. When she gives birth to a boy and a girl, they are cast in the water and replaced for a kitty and a puppy. The twins are saved by a fisherman. Years later, they leave home and find a hut in the woods. The hut belongs to an old lady, who welcomes the twins into her home. The old lady tells them about the Bird that Talks, which can reveal the truth to them, but is located in a castle's garden with several other birds, to confound whoever seeks it.

In the third variant, Las Tres Hermanas y el Rey, a king rides in his carriage with two footsmen and his son, the prince, when heavy rain starts to pour. They seek shelter in the house of three orphaned sisters. The king overhears their gossip: the elder wants to amrry the king's cook, the middle one the king's charcoal-burner, and the youngest the prince himself, for she will bear him two sons with the sun on the front, and a girl with the moon on the forehead. The next day, the king takes his cook, the charcoal-burner and his son to the house of the sisters to fulfill their marriage wishes. The youngest sister becomes the prince's wife and gives birth to a boy, a girl, and a boy, who are taken from her by the jealous elder sisters and cast in the water.

Central America
According to Terrence L. Hansen's study, the tale type is also known in the folklore of Dominican Republic and Puerto Rico.

Dominican Republic
According to Terrence L. Hansen's study, the tale type is also known in the folklore of Dominican Republic, with 12 variants registered.

Scholar Manuel José Andrade published 4 variants he grouped under the banner The treacherous substitution of dogs for new-born children. In El niño del lucero de la frente, three sisterly princesses promise grand things for the king: the elder that she will weave a little handkerchief of silver, the middle one that she will weave a little handkerchief of gold, and the youngest that she will bear the king a boy with a star on the forehead, golden hair and eyes of crystal. She marries the king and bears the boy, who is replaced by a cat and thrown in the river. The princess is punished by being spat on by the citizens. The boy is raised by a peasant and meets his mother, but does not spit at her.

In another variant, La s-helmana envidiosa, the king marries a girl named Delgadina, the youngest of three sisters. Her sisters, Mariquita and Quinquilina, become jealous of her and replace her children for cats. Delgadina's three sons are given to a peasant, and years later they seek a bird that talks, the tree that sings and the golden water.

In another variant, La tre helmana, three sisters marry the princes. The elder sister gives birth to a son, to the jealousy of the other two. The sisters replace their nephews for a cat, a piece of rotten meat and a dog, and cast them in the water in a box. The three sons grow up and seek the rosewater, the tree that plays and the bird that speaks.

Panama
Author Mario Riera Pinilla published two variants from Panama. In the first, Los Hijos del Rey, a queen has two children, a boy and a girl, both with a star on the front. Envious Black servants take the children and cast them in the water in a box, and replace the queen's two children for someone else's babies. The king sees the substituted children and orders his wife to be locked in the dungeon. The box with the children is found by a peasant, who raises the children. After he works a lot, he leaves them a palace. After he dies, an old witch visits their palace and tells about the rooster that sings and the crystal tree. Juanito, the brother, decides to go after the objects.

In another variant, titled Los Tres Infantes, a king wants to have three children: the sun, the moon and the Eastern star. He marries a woman who promises to bear him these children. The queen's sisters cast the children in the sea and replace them for puppies. After the king sees the animals, he orders the queen to be buried up to the neck under the dinner table, where she is to feed only on food crumbles. As for the children, they are saved by a fisherman and raised in his humble hut. Years later, a witch visits the siblings and tells them about the tree of all flowers, the bird of all harmonies and the springwell of all (water) sources. The two elder brothers, the sun and the Eastern star, fail in the quest, and their sister, the moon, gets the bird, the tree and the springwell, thanks to an old man's guidance. They bring the objects to their house.

South America

Argentina
Folklorist and researcher Berta Elena Vidal de Battini collected eight variants all over Argentina, throughout the years, and published them as part of an extensive compilation of Argentinian folk-tales. Another variant (La Luna y el Sol) has been collected by Susana Chertudi.

Scholar Bertha Koessler-Ilg collected and published from the Mapuche of Argentina an etiological tale she titled Dónde y cómo tuvieron origen los colibries (English: "How and why the hummingbirds were created"), with several similarities with the tale-type. In this story, the inca (lord) marries Painemilla ("Oro azul" or "blue gold"), who gives birth to twins, a boy and a girl, both with golden hair. However, her envious sister, Painefilu ("Vibora azul" or "blue viper") replaces the children for puppies.

Chile
Terrence Hansen also reported variants of tale type 707 in Chile, with 14 tales listed.

Folklorist  collected two variants he grouped under the banner Las dos hermanas envidiosas de la menor ("The two sisters envious of their youngest"): La Luna i el Sol ("Moon and Sun") and La niña con la estrella de oro en la frente ("The girl with the golden star on her forehead"). This last tale is unique in that the queen gives birth to female twins: the eponymous girl and her golden-haired sister, and its second part has similarities with Biancabella and the Snake.

Chilean folklorist  collected another variant from a twenty-year-old youth from Rancagua, titled El Loro Adivino ("The Divining Parrot"). In this story, three sisters, Flor Rosa, Flor Hortensia y Flor María, comment among themselves their potential marriages. The youngest, Flor María, says if she were to marry the king, she would give birth to three children with "el Sol, el Lucero y la Luna" on the front. She marries the king, her envious sisters replace the babies for animals, put them in a box and cast them in a stream. The box is found by a "hortelano" (herb-gatherer) and his wife, who raise the children. When they are twelve, the fosters parents die and Sol, the oldest, decides to seek their real parents. He meets an old lady on the road who tells him to seek "el Arbol que canta, el Agua de la vida y el Loro adivino" (the singing tree, the water of life and divining bird). As usual, only the youngest sister is successful in the quest and rescues her brothers, as well as restores a prince to his human shape and heals a blind king.

Chilean folklorist  collected three Chilean variants: El sol y la luna, Maria Ignacia y Juancito and Maria Ceniza. In the first tale, the third sister promises to give birth to "the Sun and the Moon" (a twin with the sun on the front and another with the moon on the front), and a boy and a girl are born. In the second tale, despite lacking the usual introduction with the three sisters (their mother's generation), the brother and the sister are raised by the king's herb-gatherer and seek the leaping fish with the sparkling water, the tree that yields all types of fruits and the one that tells the truth. In the third tale (that begins like Cinderella), a gentleman wishes to be father to twins with the sun and the moon on the front, and Maria Ceniza (the Cinderella-like character) promises to give birth to them.

In a variant from the Maule Region with the title El árbol que canta, el pájaro que habla y el agua de oro, a king goes out at night to listen to the conversations of his people. One night, h espies on one of your minister's three daughters: the oldest wants to marry the king's butler to drink the finest drinks; the middle one the cook to eat the finest pastries, and the youngest the king himself. The third sister marries the king and gives birth to three children in three consecutive pregnancies: two boys and a girl. They are each cast in the water, but saved by another one of the king's ministers. On their adoptive father's deathbed, the minister tells the siblings to quest for the singing tree, the talking bird and the golden water to ensure their happiness.

Chilean writer Antonio Cárdenas Tabies published a tale from Chiloé with the title La Botella Bailarina ("The Dancing Bottle"): a king lives next to three sisters, who all wish to marry the king's son, but the youngest is the one that becomes his bride. While the prince is away, his wife gives birth to twins, a boy and a girl, who are called Sol ('Sun') and Luna ('Moon'). The princess's sisters take the twins, place them in a box with a silver lock and cast them in the water. An old man saves them from the river and raises them. When they are at school, they are mocked by their colleagues for being foundlings, which the old man confirms. The twins decide to make their way in the world and move out to their mother's city, where they rent a place to live. While Sol is hunting, Luna stays home. One day, she is visited by an old woman that compliments their house, but tells her the house needs the botella bailarina ('dancing bottle') and the 'Pájaro Buen Cantor', a type of singing bird, which are located at the house of the 'Vieja Encantadora' ("Sorcerous Old Lady").

Colombia
In a Colombian version published by John Bierhorst, The Three Sisters, after the children are cast in the water and reared by the royal gardener, the queen, their mother, comments with the gardener that the royal gardens need "a bird that speaks, an orange tree that dances, and water that jumps and leaps". The sister's brothers, Bamán and Párvis, offer to obtain the treasures, but it is their sister who finishes the quest and rescues her brothers.

Ecuador
In an Ecuadorian variant, Del Irás y Nunca Volverás ("[The Place] of Going and Not Returning"), three sisters express their wishes to marry the baker, the royal cook and the king himself. The third sister marries the king and gives birth (in consecutive pregnancies) to two boys and a girl with a star on the front. Her sisters replace them for animals and cast them in the water. They are saved by a childess old couple. Years later, the king visits their house and a servant tells them of three wonders to embellish their garden: the singing tree, the golden water and the speaking bird. This tale was also classified as type 707.

In another Ecuadorian tale titled Las Tres Hermanas ("The Three Sisters"), three sisters work at night, despite the king's prohibition, and are brought before the king. The king marries the third sisters, and weds first to the baker, the second to the cook. The king's wife promises to give birth to three girls named Maria. She does, but the queen's sisters cast them in the river and replaces them for puppies. The three girls are found by a neighbouring king, who raises them. The three sisters learn to play instruments. Their father is enchanted by their music and falls in love with one of the girls. However, a bird warns the king that the three girls are his daughters. He learns the truth and kills the envious sisters-in-law.

Bolivia
Two variants are reported to have been collected, one in Spanish, the other in Quechua. In one of them, titled El sol y la luna ("Sun and Moon"), the queen gives birth to children "like the sun and the moon".

Latin America
In a Latin American tale, The Talking Bird, the Singing Tree and the Fountain of Gold, a king likes to hunt in the forest, and reaches a hut in a village. He overhears three sisters talking inside a hut: the elder wants to marry the king's baker, the middle one the king's cook, and the youngest the king himself. The king marries the girls to their spouses of choice. Later, the queen gives birth to two boys and a girl, in three consecutive pregnancies; her jealous sisters take the children and cast them in the water, and accuse the children of devouring them. The children are saved by a couple of elderly farmers. After the farmers die, the three siblings hear about a mountain where they can find a talking bird, a singing tree and a fountain of gold. The two brothers fail and are turned to stone, and their sister obtains the treasures and restores her brothers to life.

Bibliography
 Miller, Elaine K. Mexican Folk Narrative from the Los Angeles Area: Introduction, Notes, and Classification. New York, USA: University of Texas Press, 2021. pp. 256–257, 302.

References 

American fairy tales
Fictional kings
Fictional queens
Twins in fiction
Fictional twins
Child abandonment
Adoption forms and related practices
Adoption, fostering, orphan care and displacement
Birds in culture
Fictional birds
ATU 700-749